Mushemi-ye Olya (also Romanized as Mūshemī-ye ‘Olyā; also known as Mūshemī and Mūshemī-ye Bālā) is a village in Zilayi Rural District, Margown District, Boyer-Ahmad County, Kohgiluyeh and Boyer-Ahmad Province, Iran. At the 2006 census, its population was 114, in 27 families.

References 

Populated places in Boyer-Ahmad County